Wray "Nik" Stuart, MBE (20 July 1927 – 24 June 2002) was a British gymnast. He competed at the 1956 and 1960 Summer Olympics in all artistic gymnastics events. His best achievement was 19th place all-around with the British team in 1960.

He was born the tenth child in a family of 12. In his teens he assisted his father, a plumber, and worked as a bricklayer. In 1946 he joined the army where he trained in boxing, diving and pole vaulting. Only in 1952, while stationed in Singapore, he became interested in gymnastics and later won nine consecutive British titles between 1956 and 1964. In 1962 he was appointed MBE for his achievements in sport. Two years later he left the army to become the head coach of the British gymnastics team. Between 1964 and 1989 he published about a dozen of books on training in artistic gymnastics. He retired in 1985, but continued to train himself and others at a local gym. The last two years of his life he suffered from Alzheimer's disease.

He married twice and had three children with his first wife, Edna. In 1987 he married second time, to Terry Liddle (née Henderson).

References

1927 births
2002 deaths
Gymnasts at the 1956 Summer Olympics
Gymnasts at the 1960 Summer Olympics
British male artistic gymnasts
Olympic gymnasts of Great Britain
Royal Army Physical Training Corps soldiers
Military personnel from Yorkshire
20th-century British Army personnel